Yaragalla  is a village in the southern state of Karnataka, India.

Geography 
It is located in Muddebihal taluk of Bijapur district, Karnataka. It is nearly 80 km from district headquarters, Bijapur. It is one of several small villages near Muddebihal town.

Demographics 

 India census, Yaragalla had a population of 1,500 with 800 males and 700 females. The literacy rate is more than 70%.

The village hosts multiple Hindu temples: Shree Ghanamateshwar Temple, Shree Hanuman Temple, Shree Kidiganneshwara Temple and Shree Dyamavva devi Temple.

The villagers mainly celebrate 'Shri Kidiganneshwara Jatre (Festival)','Shri Ghanamateshwar punya thithi', 'Dyamavva devi jaatre', 'Moharam', 'Yella Amavasye' and Kara Hunnume, Nagara Panchami, Deepavli, Ugadi, Dassara.

Economy 

More than 80% of the land is used for agriculture. Jowar, wheat, groundnut, sunflower, and cotton are the main crops, but since water canals were built, more than half the population raises sugarcane. Sources of water irrigation include water canals, borewells and wells.

Transport 

Yaragalla is connected to the main town Muddebihal and nearby villages.

Education 

A Govt Higher Primary School (HPS, Yaragalla) enrolls 1st to 8th standard, including more than 150 students.

References

External links 

Villages in Bijapur district, Karnataka